Marcel Lambrechts (born 4 May 1931) is a Belgian sprinter. He competed in the men's 400 metres at the 1960 Summer Olympics.

References

External links
 

1931 births
Living people
Athletes (track and field) at the 1956 Summer Olympics
Athletes (track and field) at the 1960 Summer Olympics
Belgian male sprinters
Belgian male hurdlers
Olympic athletes of Belgium
Place of birth missing (living people)